At Newport 1958 is a live album by the jazz musician Miles Davis featuring the Miles Davis Quintet's complete performance recorded at the Newport Jazz Festival in 1958. The album was first released as a single CD in 2001 though four tracks had previously been released in part as one side of the LP Miles & Monk at Newport (Columbia, 1964). The entire concert was given its first complete release as part of The Complete Columbia Recordings of Miles Davis with John Coltrane box set in 1999, and all tracks were included on the 2015 compilation Miles Davis at Newport 1955-1975: The Bootleg Series Vol. 4.

Track listing
 Introduction by Willis Conover - 2:16
 "Ah-leu-cha" (Charlie Parker) - 5:53
 "Straight, No Chaser" (Thelonious Monk) - 8:48
 "Fran-Dance" (Miles Davis) - 7:14
 "Two Bass Hit" (John Lewis, Dizzy Gillespie) - 4:11
 "Bye Bye Blackbird" (Mort Dixon, Ray Henderson) - 9:11
 "The Theme" (Davis) - 2:49

Tracks 2-5 originally issued on Miles and Monk at Newport;
tracks 6 and 7 originally issued on Newport Jazz Festival Live;
John Coltrane appears courtesy of Prestige Records.

Personnel
 Miles Davis — trumpet
 Cannonball Adderley — alto saxophone
 John Coltrane — tenor saxophone
 Bill Evans — piano
 Paul Chambers — double bass
 Jimmy Cobb — drums

References

Miles Davis live albums
Albums recorded at the Newport Jazz Festival
Columbia Records live albums
1958 live albums
Albums produced by Michael Cuscuna
Albums produced by Teo Macero
Albums produced by Bob Belden
1958 in Rhode Island